Schaeffer is a German surname. It is a variant of Schaefer, from schäfer ("shepherd") and of  Schaffer, from a noun (meaning steward or bailiff) derived from Middle High German schaffen.

People with the surname

A
 Albert Charles Schaeffer, American mathematician

B
 Billy Schaeffer, retired American professional basketball player
 Boguslaw Schaeffer, Polish composer and theoretician
 Brent Schaeffer, American arena football quarterback

C
 Charles Frederick Schaeffer (1807–1879), Lutheran clergyman of the United States
 Charles William Schaeffer (1813–1896), Lutheran clergyman and theologian of the United States
 Chester Schaeffer, American film editor
 Claude Schaeffer, French archaeologist who helped uncover the Ugaritic religious texts

D
 David Frederick Schaeffer (1787–1837), Lutheran clergyman of the United States

E
 Edith Schaeffer, Chinese-American Christian author and widow of Francis Schaeffer
 Eric Schaeffer, American actor
 Eric D. Schaeffer, American theatre director

F
 Francis Schaeffer, American-French theologian, philosopher, and founder of L'Abri
 Frank Schaeffer, French son of Francis Schaeffer
 Frederick Christian Schaeffer (1792–1832), Lutheran clergyman of the United States
 Frederick David Schaeffer (1760–1836), German-born Lutheran clergyman of the United States

G
 Georg Anton Schäffer, (1779–1836), German physician and adventurer
 George Schaeffer, former American head coach of the Arizona State college football program

H
 Harry Schaeffer, former American major league baseball pitcher

J
 Jacob Christian Schaeffer, 17th century German scientist
 Jack Schaeffer (born John Case Schaeffer II), American musician, record producer and clarinetist
 James Schaeffer (1885–1972), American college sports coach
 James Soloman Schaeffer, American drum major and former leader of the Highty-Tighties
 Jim Schaeffer, American drum major and former leader of the Highty-Tighties (relative of James Soloman Schaeffer)
 Jody Schaeffer, American cartoonist and co-creator of Megas XLR
John Schaeffer (art collector) (1941–2020), Australian art collector and businessman 
John Schaeffer (environmentalist) (born 1949), American solar power advocate
John Schaeffer (trainer) (born 1951), American fitness trainer and author
John Nevin Schaeffer (1882–1942), American classicist
 Jonathan Schaeffer, Canadian computer scientist

L
 Lucien Schaeffer, French former footballer who played at the 1948 Summer Olympics
 Lawrence Schaeffer (born 1947), American geneticist

M
 Matthew Schaeffer, American guitarist in the rock band Monovox
 Mead Schaeffer, American artist and illustrator

P
 Pierre Schaeffer, French musician and pioneer of musique concrète

R
 Rebecca Schaeffer (1967–1989), American actress who was murdered by a fan
 Roberto Schaefer, American photographer known for his work in the film Quantum of Solace

S
 Sandra Schaeffer (born 1946), American singer, author and game inventor
 Serafia Fredrika Schaeffer (1800-1887), Finnish herbal healer
 Stefanie Schaeffer, The Apprentice 6 winner
 Steve Schaeffer, American studio musician

T
 Tarah Lynne Schaeffer, American actress known for her role on Sesame Street
 Tom Schaeffer (born 1940), Swedish curler, 1973 world champion

W
 Wendy Schaeffer, Australian equestrian and Olympic champion

See also
 Schaefer

References

External links
 WhitePages.com: People with the surname Schaeffer located in the United States

French-language surnames
German-language surnames
Jewish surnames
Lists of people by surname